Talat Mammadagha oghlu Gasimov (June 21, 1933 — July 28, 2013) was an Azerbaijani khananda, People's Artiste of Azerbaijan.

Biography 
Talat Gasimov was born on June 21, 1933 in Baku. At first, he was very interested in religious music and started reciting elegy. Later he became a khananda. He took mugham lessons from Zulfu Adigozalov and Hajibaba Huseynov. "Rast", "Shur", "Segah-Zabul" mugam-dasgahs, "Shushtar" classification performed by him are kept in the fund of Azerbaijan State Television and Radio.

T. Gasimov was a soloist of the Azerbaijan State Philharmonic Hall. For many years he was a soloist of the "Azerconcert" Union, represented the Azerbaijani musical culture in various countries around the world — Turkey, Iran, Germany, Russia, Egypt, Algeria, Tunisia, Morocco.

Talat Gasimov died on July 28, 2013 in Baku.

Awards 
 People's Artiste of Azerbaijan — May 16, 2006
 Honored Artist of the Republic of Azerbaijan — May 24, 1998

References 

1933 births
2013 deaths
Mugham singers